Hanns Brandstätter (born 4 June 1949) is an Austrian fencer. He competed in at the 1972, 1976 and 1984 Summer Olympics.

References 

1949 births
Living people
Austrian male fencers
Austrian sabre fencers
Olympic fencers of Austria
Fencers at the 1972 Summer Olympics
Fencers at the 1976 Summer Olympics
Fencers at the 1984 Summer Olympics
Sportspeople from Villach